John Friend (born May 30, 1959), born Clifford Friend, is an American yoga guru and creator of Anusara Yoga.

Early life and career

Friend first learned of yoga at the age of 8 in Youngstown, Ohio when his mother, Ann Friend, read him stories of yogis with hidden knowledge and supernatural powers. By age 13, he began studying yoga philosophy with the Bhagavad Gita and Upanishads, and also began an asana practice by following Swami Satchidananda's book Integral Hatha Yoga.

At 17, Friend began a regular practice of sitting meditation with a Sufi group as well as members of the Theosophical Society. At age 19 he moved to Houston, Texas where he studied various styles of hatha yoga including Ananda Yoga, Sivananda Yoga, and Kundalini Yoga. He also began teaching yoga part-time while working as a financial analyst.

In 1984, Friend began practicing the Ashtanga Vinyasa Yoga Primary Series and, in 1986, quit his analyst job to teach yoga full-time. In 1987, Friend graduated to Secondary Series while studying with Ashtanga founder K. Pattabhi Jois in California where he also studied with Iyengar Yoga teacher Judith Lasater. That same year, Friend attended an Iyengar Yoga convention in Boston, where he met B.K.S. Iyengar, after which Friend focused his studies and practice mainly in Iyengar Yoga. Between 1990 and 1995, John earned Iyengar's Introductory and Junior Intermediate teaching certificates and also served on the Board of Directors for the Iyengar Yoga National Association before departing in 1997 to found Anusara Yoga.

Anusara Yoga

Friend set up Anusara as a style of hatha yoga founded on a Tantric philosophy of intrinsic goodness and based on bio mechanical principles of alignment. Friend derived the name Anusara as meaning 'flowing with Grace,' 'flowing with Nature' and 'following your heart,'" as interpreted from the Sanskrit , meaning "custom, usage, natural state or condition". Founded on Iyengar's system of alignment, Friend streamlined everything into five "Universal Principles of Alignment", which corresponded to other quinary aspects of the world, such as the five elements, five regular polygons, five fingers on the hand, and so on. Friend also developed refinements to his quinary system, which included what he called "the Three A's of Anusara" (attitude, alignment and action), seven energy loops that comprise the human body, and various cues to assist in teaching.

Anusara's philosophical system drew from Friend's knowledge in Indian schools of thought, including Samkhya, Advaita Vedanta, Vajrayana Buddhism, and non-dual Hindu Tantric schools, particularly non-dual Shaivism, which he refers to as Shiva-Shakti Tantra. Friend also incorporates his other studies, such as Taoism, Sufism, Kabbalah, Theosophy, Wicca, quantum physics, sacred geometry, and western psychology.

2012 scandal
In February 2012, an anonymous tipster published accusations on jfexposed.com (short for "John Friend exposed"), which later appeared on the blog YogaDork.  These allegations of mismanagement and abuse were later reported on at length in an article in The Washington Post. The four key accusations against Friend were:

That John Friend led a Wiccan coven called Blazing Solar Flames whose members allegedly included female Anusara students, teachers and employees. The tipster provided documentation that John Friend engaged in sexual relations with women in the coven, including a letter allegedly written by him to a coven member with whom he had sexual relations, and described an 'alignment' between Wicca and the Anusara system of yoga.  Friend had Anusara's graphics team design a logo for the coven according to three former employees. It was later revealed that John may not belong to any Wiccan lineage or tradition.
That John Friend had sexual affairs with several married Anusara employees and teachers. In a  February  2012 interview, Friend admitted to the truth of this allegation.
That John Friend froze funding of employees' defined benefits plans, avoiding notification to employees, and thus violated federal ERISA regulations. The tipster claimed that Friend's company, Anusara, Inc., made the change to the plan in January 2010, but waited until December 2010 to provide oral notification to some employees. In December 2011, 204(h) notification had still not been provided and the tipster made a complaint to the U.S. Department of Labor. In January 2012, Anusara, Inc. finally provided official notification, but attempted to backdate the notification, as well as the effective freeze date, to January 1, 2010. In response to this complaint about the backdating, the Department of Labor advised Anusara, Inc. that it was in violation. Anusara, Inc. then restored funds to the account and provided notification of a freeze to take place in the future.  John Friend provided documentation verifying the pension notification violations and the timeline outlined by the tipster. The documentation included a letter from Anusara Inc. which assured employees that there was never an intention to be deceptive. Friend eventually admitted this was the result of his oversight that was subsequently corrected after an employee complained to government regulators.
 That John Friend placed employees and personal assistants in legal jeopardy, arranging for them to personally accept delivery of packages of marijuana shipped for Friend's own use to Anusara's office. This allegation is supported by statements made by John Friend's former personal assistant and also by Friend's statements to a committee of Anusura advisers, as described in a document obtained by The Washington Post.

Exit from Anusara
Friend announced in March 2012 that he would step down from the leadership, while retaining the sole ownership, of Anusara Yoga to take a short leave of absence to consider his next steps in the yoga community.

Sridaiva and Bowspring 

In 2013, John Friend began working with Colorado-based yoga teaching sisters Desi and Micah Springer to help systematize a yoga methodology they had developed. Prior to this, Friend had been dating Desi Springer. Originally called "The Roots" practice, the yoga system was rebranded in 2013 as Sridaiva (श्रदेव, Sanskrit for "divine destiny") as coupled with an alignment methodology called Bowspring. Friend teaches the Bowspring method at Vital Yoga Studio as well as on international teaching tours with Springer.

References

1959 births
American yoga teachers
Educators from Ohio
Living people
People from Youngstown, Ohio
Sacred geometry
Modern yoga pioneers
Modern yoga gurus